Hybrid-origin may refer to:
Multiregional hypothesis
Archaic human admixture with modern humans
the "hybrid-origin theory" of Stan Gooch, published in the 1970s

See also
Hybridisation (disambiguation)